Mounir El Haimour (born 29 October 1980) is a French football player of Moroccan origin who plays as a winger for fifth-tier Championnat National 3 club Châtellerault.

Career
He signed for Barnsley on 27 June 2008 from Neuchâtel Xamax.

References

External links

1980 births
French sportspeople of Moroccan descent
Sportspeople from Limoges
Footballers from Nouvelle-Aquitaine
Living people
French footballers
Association football fullbacks
Association football midfielders
SO Châtellerault players
GOAL FC players
Yverdon-Sport FC players
FC Spartak Vladikavkaz players
FC Schaffhausen players
Neuchâtel Xamax FCS players
Barnsley F.C. players
Stade Poitevin FC players
US Chauvigny players
Swiss Challenge League players
Russian Premier League players
Swiss Super League players
English Football League players
Championnat National 3 players
French expatriate footballers
Expatriate footballers in Switzerland
French expatriate sportspeople in Switzerland
Expatriate footballers in Russia
French expatriate sportspeople in Russia
Expatriate footballers in England
French expatriate sportspeople in England